Pharoscymnus flexibilis is a species of lady beetle in the family Coccinellidae. It is found in Southern Asia.

References

Further reading

 
 

Coccinellidae
Articles created by Qbugbot
Beetles described in 1853